George Robinson nicknamed "Wee George" was an Australian professional rugby league footballer who played in the 1910s and 1920s.  He played his entire career for Balmain in the NSWRL competition during the club's first golden era which won 6 premierships.  Robinson later coached the club at various levels.

Background
Robinson was born in Balmain, New South Wales, Australia.  He was the brother of Jack 'Junker' Robinson who played for Balmain between 1912 and 1925.

Playing career
Robinson began his first grade career with Balmain in 1915 winning a premiership in his first season at the club.  The 1915 premiership was also Balmain's first.  Robinson did not play for the club in 1916 or 1917 missing out on those premiership successes but returned to Balmain in 1918.

In 1919, Robinson won his second premiership with Balmain as they finished top of the table without needing to play in a grand final to determine the outright premiership winner.  This was followed by his third premiership win with Balmain as they finished first on the table ahead of rivals Glebe.  In the same year, Robinson was selected to play for New South Wales.

In 1922, Robinson was selected to play for Metropolis, the earlier version of the NSW City rugby league team.

In 1924, Robinson played 6 games for Balmain but missed out on playing in the club's grand final victory over South Sydney.  Robinson played with Balmain up until the end of 1928 before retiring.

Coaching career
Robinson became first grade coach of Balmain in 1933.  His time as first grade coach at the club was not as successful as when he was a player and the club missed out on the finals in each of his 3 seasons there.

Robinson then went on to coach the Balmain reserve grade side for 32 consecutive years and was later made a life member of the club.

References

Balmain Tigers players
Balmain Tigers coaches
New South Wales rugby league team players
Australian rugby league coaches
Australian rugby league players
Rugby league players from Sydney
Rugby league halfbacks
Rugby league five-eighths
Year of birth missing
Year of death missing
Place of death missing